Ischnocolus valentinus is a small, old-world tarantula. It is found in Spain, Italy, Morocco, Algeria, Tunisia and Libya. It is the only species of true tarantula to occur in continental Europe. It is the type species of the genus Ischnocolus. It is found in Mediterranean scrub with oaks and bushes, hiding under large flattish stones.  The species originally called the tarantula in Europe is Lycosa tarantula, a large species of wolf spider.

References

Theraphosidae
Spiders of Africa
Spiders of Europe
Taxa named by Léon Jean Marie Dufour
Spiders described in 1820